The Armed Forces of Ukraine had a large number of Guards units. On 22 August 2016, with the removal of Soviet distinctions from the Armed Forces of Ukraine, the Guards titles were removed from the names of the units. The page lists all former Ukrainian guards units.

Army
6th Guards Army Order of the Red Banner Corps
93rd Guards Mechanized Kharkiv twice Orders of the Red Banner, Suvorov and Kutuzov Brigade
17th Guards Armored Kryvyi Rih Orders of the Red Banner and Suvorov Brigade
28th Guards Mechanized Brigade
534th Guards Combat Engineer Battalion
150th Guards Signal Battalion
121st Guards Signal Fokshano-Mukdensk Orders of the Alexander Nevsky and Red Star Regiment
806th Guards Signal Uman Orders of the Red Banner and Bogdan Khmelnitsky Regiment
8th Army Corps
72nd Guards Mechanized Chervonohrad-Kyiv Order of Red Banner Brigade
30th Guards Mechanized Novohrad-Volynskyi Rivne Orders of the Red Banner and Suvorov Brigade
54th Guards Reconnaissance Prutsko-Pomeransk Orders of Kutuzov, Bogdan Khmelnitsky, Alexander Nevsky Battalion
1st Guards Armored Novohrad Orders of the Red Banner, Kutuzov, Bogdan Khmelnitsky, Alexander Nevsky and Red Star Brigade
13th Army Corps
51st Guards Mechanized Perekops'ko-Kharkivska Praz'ko-Volynska Order of Lenin, twice Order of Red Banner, Orders of Suvorov and Kutuzov Brigade
128th Guards Mechanized Turkestans'ko-Zakarpats'ka twice Order of Red Banner Brigade
15th Guards Mountain Infantry Sevastopol Order of Bogdan Khmelnitsky Battalion
11th Guards Artillery Kyiv Red Banner Bogdan Khmelnitsky orders brigade
15th Guards Artillery Kyiv Orders of Lenin, Red Banner, Bogdan Khmelnitsky and Alexander Nevsky Regiment
300th Guards Mechanized Budapest Regiment
21st Guards Mechanized Rechytskii Orders of the Red Banner, Suvorov and Bogdan Khmelnitsky Battalion
169th Training Guards Zvenyhorodsk Orders of the Red Banner and Suvorov Center
354th Training Guards Mechanized Kyshuniv Order of Suvorov Regiment
300th Training Guards Armored Sandomir Order of Alexander Nevsky Regiment
11th Guards Combat Engineer Berlin Regiment
554th Training Guards Signal Battalion
208th Guards Anti-Aircraft Order of the Red Banner Brigade
50th Guards Anti-Aircraft Sevastopol-Feodosiiskii Regiment
126th Guards Signal Battalion

Education facilities
Kharkiv Guards Faculty of Military Training of National Technical University "KhPI", former Kharkiv Guards Institute of Armored Force

Air Force
831st Guards Fighter Aviation Galych Orders of the Red Banner and Kutuzov Brigade
456th Guards Transport Aviation Volgograd Order of the Red Banner Brigade
208th Guards Anti-Aircraft Artillery Order of the Red Banner Brigade

Navy
25th Guards Transport Naval Aviation Moscow Brigade

MVS
10th Territorial Guards Order of the Red Star Signal Unit

SBU
Guards Aviation Base of Internal Troops

DPSU
Guards Orsha Orders of Suvorov, Kutuzov and Alexander Nevsky Training Center of Preparation of Junior Specialists for State Border Guard Service of Ukraine

STSU
1st Joint Guards Varshavskii Order of Kutuzov Unit
11th Separate Guards Mobile Order of the Red Star Unit

References

 
Decommunization in Ukraine
guard